The 2021 NC State Wolfpack football team represented North Carolina State University during the 2021 NCAA Division I FBS football season. The Wolfpack played their home games at Carter–Finley Stadium in Raleigh, North Carolina and competed in the Atlantic Division of the Atlantic Coast Conference. They were led by ninth-year head coach Dave Doeren.

The Wolfpack finished their regular season with a 9–3 overall record, and accepted a bid to the Holiday Bowl, where they were due to face UCLA. Hours before game time on December 28, UCLA withdrew from the bowl due to COVID-19 issues, and the bowl was canceled. NC State was awarded the Holiday Bowl trophy after the cancelation and considers the game forfeited, giving the program its second (after 2002) 10-win season—the 10th win (for the Holiday Bowl) is claimed by NC State and not officially recognized by the NCAA and ACC. NC State beat Clemson for the first time since 2011.

Previous season
In a season limited due to the ongoing COVID-19 pandemic, the Wolfpack finished the 2020 season 8–4, 7–3 in ACC play to finish in a tie for third place in the conference. They received an invite to the Gator Bowl where they were defeated by Kentucky 21–23.

Schedule
NC State announced its 2021 football schedule on January 28, 2021.
Source

Coaching staff

Source

Roster

Source

Game summaries

South Florida

at Mississippi State

Furman

No. 9 Clemson

Louisiana Tech

at Boston College

at Miami

vs Louisville

at Florida State

at No. 12 Wake Forest

Syracuse

North Carolina

Rankings

Players drafted into the NFL

References

NC State
NC State Wolfpack football seasons
NC State Wolfpack football